The 1976–77 Southern Hockey League season was the fourth and final season of the Southern Hockey League. The Roanoke Valley Rebels ceased operations, and two new teams were added for the season. The Baltimore Clippers transferred from the American Hockey League, and the Richmond Wildcats were an expansion team. Both the Richmond Wildcats and Greensboro Generals folded on January 3, 1977 due to financial problems. On January 7, the Tidewater Sharks folded after missing payroll, and the Winston-Salem Polar Twins pulled the Polar Twins out of the league. The remaining three teams considered adding a fourth team, but the league was short on funds when Greensboro and Winstom-Salem defaulted on $25,000 loans. The league also considered playing a round-robin tournament to determine a champion, or develop an interlocking schedule with either the North American Hockey League or the International Hockey League. On January 22, 1977, both the NAHL and IHL rejected the proposal, and the final game was played on January 31, 1977, although the league planned on playing a 1977–78 season.

Standings
Final standings of the regular season.

WHA/NHL affiliations
Southern Hockey League franchises were primarily affiliated with World Hockey Association teams, however some also had agreements with National Hockey League teams. Summary of WHA/NHL affiliation agreements:

Scoring leaders
Top 10 SHL points scoring leaders.

References

Southern
Southern Hockey League (1973–1977)